Gøril Snorroeggen (born 15 February 1985) is a former Norwegian handball player, who played for Byåsen and Esbjerg. She comes from an athletic family; her father was active in orienteering and her mother has played for Byåsen I.L., the team in which her elder sister, Marte Snorroeggen also has played for.

She began her career at the youth sports club Kattem IL, where she then played both football and handball. At age 13, she switched handball clubs to the Byåsen youth team, but continued to play football for Kattem. She proved to be successful in both sports, and represented Norway in the respective National Youth Teams. At age 16, she made a decision to focus her career on handball and left Kattem. Snorroeggen made her debut on the senior national handball team on 22 October 2004, and has played 102 games, scoring 224 goals before she played her last national team match on 11 August 2012 against Montenegro. Amongst her accomplishments with the national team are the Olympic gold medals that she received at the 2008 Summer Olympics and the 2012 Summer Olympics and the gold medal at the 2011 World Championships. In 2013, she retired as a professional handball player.

She made a comeback on the handball court on 27 September 2014 for Heimdal IF as a goalkeeper against Levanger HK on level 3.

References

1985 births
Norwegian female handball players
Handball players at the 2008 Summer Olympics
Handball players at the 2012 Summer Olympics
Olympic handball players of Norway
Olympic gold medalists for Norway
Living people
Olympic medalists in handball
Medalists at the 2012 Summer Olympics
Medalists at the 2008 Summer Olympics
Sportspeople from Trondheim